is a Japanese koryū swordsmanship style that was founded in 1682 by .  The name roughly translates as "mind shape/form sword school". The style places a high emphasis on swordsmanship philosophy, mainly to-ho-no-sho-shin or "the heart of the sword".

Information
Systems: kenjutsu (odachi, kodachi, nitto), iaijutsu, naginatajutsu, kagitsuki naginata (glaive mounted with a crossbar at the juncture of haft and blade) 
Date founded: 1682 
Founded by: Iba Josuiken Hideaki 
Present representative/headmaster: Kobayashi Masao 5th generation instructor at the Kameyama Enbujō 
Primarily located in: Mie Prefecture

References
Skoss, Diane (Editor). 1997. Koryu Bujutsu.Classical Warrior Traditions of Japan, volume 1. New Jersey, Koryu Books. 

Japanese swordsmanship
Ko-ryū bujutsu